L Paung Sho (also spelt L Phaung Sho) is a Burmese politician and former educational staffer who currently serves as MP in the Kayah State Parliament for Mese Township constituency No. 2. He previously served as Chief Minister of Kayah State, as the head of Kayah State Government.

Early life and education
L Paung Sho was born on 5 February 1979 in Lawpita Shan Village. He received B.Ed from the University for Development of the National Races of the Union.

Political career
He joined the National League for Democracy after resigned from his post as deputy officer at a township education department in Mese. In the 2015 Myanmar general election, he contested the Mese Township constituency No. 2 for Kayah State Parliament and won a seat. He was appointed as Chief Minister of Kayah State on 30 March 2016.

L Phaung Sho was removed from his position as chief minister of Kayah State, two days after the state's parliament voted to impeach him for misappropriating state funds. He was accused of misusing state funds from renting out-state machinery and land designated by the legislature as public space.

References 

1979 births
Living people
Government ministers of Myanmar
National League for Democracy politicians
People from Kayah State